Liberal Reform Party or Liberal Reformist Party may refer to:

Liberal Reform Party (Australia)
Liberal Reform Party (Czech Republic)
Liberal Reform Party (Iceland)
Liberal Reformist Party (Moldova)
Liberal Reformist Party (Romania)
Liberal Reformers (Italy)
Liberal Reformist Party (Belgium)
Liberal Reformist Party (Puerto Rico)
Newfoundland Reform Liberal Party
Reform Party (19th-century Wisconsin)

See also
List of liberal parties